Asian Highway 85 (AH85) is a road in the Asian Highway Network running 338 km (211 miles) from Merzifon to Refahiye, Turkey. The route is as follows:

Turkey
  Road D100: Merzifon – Amasya – Refahiye

Asian Highway Network
Roads in Turkey